Xylophanes macasensis is a moth of the family Sphingidae first described by Benjamin Preston Clark in 1922. It is found from Ecuador south into Bolivia.

The wingspan is about 80 mm for both males and females. It is similar to Xylophanes ockendeni, but larger and with many pattern differences. Furthermore, the small black spots on the dorsum of the abdomen are somewhat larger. The underside of the abdomen is brown or brownish white. The forewing upperside is also similar to Xylophanes ockendeni but the ground colour is bright green, on which the darker markings stand out conspicuously. The postmedian line is dark green, more conspicuous, straighter and sharply defined and the area around the discal spot is darker, rendering the spot less conspicuous. The submarginal line of the vein spots is connected by a series of darker green lunate markings, forming a wavy line.

Adults are probably on wing year round. Adults have been reported in December.

The larvae probably feed on Rubiaceae and Malvaceae species.

References

macasensis
Moths described in 1922